The Thai LPGA Tour is a professional golf tour for women organized by the Thailand Ladies Professional Golf Association.

Founded in 2008, the Thai LPGA Tour hosted 4-6 professional events per year from 2009 to 2012. In 2013, the tour got support from the Sports Authority of Thailand and private company sponsors to expand the tour to 8 competitions. From 2017 to 2019, the final event, Thailand LPGA Masters, was co-sanctioned with the ALPG Tour and China LPGA Tour and was given Women's World Golf Ranking points.

In December 2022, Thai LPGA Tour announced the inclusion of the tour in the Women's World Golf Rankings. The tour will begin accumulating points beginning in 2023 at the BGC Championship.

Tournaments of the Thai LPGA Tour

2023 season

2022 season

2021 season

2020 season

2019 season

2018 season

2017 season

2016 season

2015 season

2014 season

2013 season

Order of Merit winners

Notes

References

External links 

Professional golf tours
Golf in Thailand
2008 establishments in Thailand